The annual Premios MTV Latinoamérica 2007 took place on 18 October 2007 in Mexico City at the Palacio de los Deportes for the second time in a row.

On 25 July 2007 the local government announced they will invest 10 million pesos on the show's planning and that they will have 16 giant screens around the city to broadcast the event live.

There were 3 new categories: Best Urban Artist, Influence Award and Fashionista.

Diego Luna was the host for the third time. He previously co-hosted the 2002 edition and hosted the 2003 edition.

Belinda Peregrin was the most nominated female artist of the year.

Café Tacuba were expected to play live on the show, but one day before the show MTV cancelled their presentation because according to MTV policies they can't have any other activities except for the ones MTV has planned for them in the upcoming week. The band are expected to play on "Las Lunas del Auditorio" on 24 October 2007.

It was announced during the red carpet that 12 million votes were counted for the different categories.

Jose Tillan was the Executive Producer of the event.

Nominations
Winners in bold.

Artist of the Year
 Belinda
 Babasónicos
 Kudai
 Alejandro Sanz
 Maná

Video of the Year
 Alejandro Sanz – "Te Lo Agradezco, Pero No (featuring Shakira)" 
 Belinda – "Bella Traición"
 Calle 13 – "Tango del Pecado" 
 Gustavo Cerati – "Adiós"
 Maná – "Manda Una Señal"
 Panda – "Los Malaventurados No Lloran"

Song of the Year
 Avril Lavigne – "Girlfriend"
 Enrique Iglesias – "Dímelo"
 Julieta Venegas – "Eres para Mí (featuring Anita Tijoux)"
 Ricky Martin – "Tu Recuerdo (featuring La Mari from Chambao and Tommy Torres)"
 Rihanna – "Umbrella (featuring Jay-Z)"

Best Solo Artist
 Alejandro Sanz
 Belinda
 Daddy Yankee
 Gustavo Cerati
 Paulina Rubio

Best Group or Duet
 Babasónicos
  Kudai
 Maná
 Miranda!
 Panda

Best Pop Artist
 Alejandro Sanz
 Belinda
 Julieta Venegas
 Miranda!
 Paulina Rubio

Best Rock Artist
 Babasónicos
 Bersuit Vergarabat
 Catupecu Machu
 Gustavo Cerati
 Moderatto

Best Urban Artist
 Anita Tijoux
 Calle 13
 Daddy Yankee
 Don Omar
 La Mala Rodríguez

Best Alternative Artist
 Allison
 División Minúscula
 Kinky
 Panda
 Zoé

Best Independent Artist
  L.E.G.O.
 Los Dynamite
 No Lo Soporto
 No Te Va Gustar
 The Hall Effect
 Turbina
No public voting

Best Pop Artist – International
 Avril Lavigne
 Gwen Stefani
 Hilary Duff
 Justin Timberlake
 Rihanna

Best Rock Artist – International
 Thirty Seconds to Mars
 Evanescence
 Maroon 5
 My Chemical Romance
 Panic! at the Disco

Best New Artist – International
 +44
 Amy Winehouse
 Fergie
 Klaxons
 Lily Allen

Best Artist – North
 Belinda
 División Minúscula
 Julieta Venegas
 Paulina Rubio
 Zoé

Best New Artist – North
 Bengala
 Camila
 María José
 Masappan
 Pambo

Best Artist – Central
 Aterciopelados
 Caramelos de Cianuro
 Kudai
 Líbido
 Los Bunkers

Best New Artist – Central
 Anita Tijoux
 Juan Fernando Velasco
 Naty Botero
 PopCorn
 Six Pack

Best Artist – South
 Airbag
 Babasónicos
 Catupecu Machu
 La Vela Puerca
 Miranda!

Best New Artist – South
 Bicicletas
 Inmigrantes
 Ella Es Tan Cargosa
 Las Pastillas del Abuelo
 Pánico Ramírez

MTV Tr3́s Viewer's Choice Award – Best Pop Artist
 Aventura
 Daddy Yankee
 Enrique Iglesias
 Jennifer Lopez
 RKM & Ken-Y

MTV Tr3́s Viewer's Choice Award – Best Urban Artist
 Calle 13
 Don Omar
 Héctor el Father
 Joell Ortiz
 Wisin & Yandel

MTV Tr3́s Viewer's Choice Award – Best New Artist
 Down AKA Kilo
 Gustavo Laureano
 Kat DeLuna
 Notch
 Xtreme

Breakthrough Artist
 Camila
 División Minúscula
 Estelares
 Jesse & Joy
 PopCorn

Promising Artist
 Bengala
 Inmigrantes
 La Mala Rodríguez
 Naif
 No Te Va Gustar
No public voting

Fashionista Award – Female
 Belinda
 Ely Guerra
 Hilary Duff
 Martha Higareda
 Paulina Rubio

Fashionista Award – Male
 Daddy Yankee
 José "Pepe" Madero (from Panda)
 Juanes
 Pablo Holman (from Kudai)
 Wilmer Valderrama

"Agent of Change" Award
 Juanes

Influence Award
 The Cure

Performances
 The Cure – "Friday I'm in Love"
 Juanes – "Me Enamora"
 Avril Lavigne – "When You're Gone" and "Girlfriend"
 Jesse & Joy – "Espacio Sideral"
 Kudai – "Déjame Gritar"
 División Minúscula – "Sognare"
 Thirty Seconds to Mars and Ely Guerra – "From Yesterday"
 Belinda – "Bella Traición"
 Hilary Duff and Plastilina Mosh – "With Love"
 Babasónicos – "El Colmo"
 The Cure – "The End of the World"
 Molotov – "Yofo"
 Los Concorde, Kudai and Miranda! – "De Música Ligera"

Appearances
 Soda Stereo – performed some of "De Música Ligera" and presented Best Group or Duet
 Airbag and Martha Higareda – introduced Avril Lavigne
 RBD – presented Best Pop Artist
 Valeria Gastaldi and Luis Roberto Guzmán – introduced Kudai, Jesse & Joy and División Minúscula
 Nicole Neumann – presented Best Rock Artist
 Panda and Dalma Maradona – introduced Thirty Seconds to Mars
 Luisana Lopilato and Valerie Domínguez – introduced Belinda
 Paulina Rubio and Wilmer Valderrama – presented Song of the Year
 Miranda! and Belanova – introduced Babasónicos
 Avril Lavigne and Thirty Seconds to Mars – presented Video of the Year
 Beto Cuevas – presented the Influence Award
 Julieta Venegas and Hilary Duff – introduced Molotov
 Álex Lora – presented Artist of the Year

Memorable moments
 One day before the show, MTV cancelled Café Tacuba's performance, one of the most expected and publicised. According to MTV's policies, acts can't have any other activities except the ones MTV had planned for them for the week after the show, and Café Tacuba had already booked a performance for "Las Lunas del Auditorio" on 24 October 2007.
 There was a power blackout during the show, just before the live performance of Hilary Duff.
 RBD, Maná, Paulina Rubio and Belinda were booed by the audience when they appeared on stage to present an award or perform.

External links
 Los Premios MTV 2007 Official website

Latin American music
MTV Video Music Awards
2007 music awards